Arayesh-E Khorshid (Make the Sun) is the tenth studio album by Iranian singer-songwriter and guitarist Kourosh Yaghmaei. The album includes a collection of Iranian folk songs that was released in 2000 by Ahang Rooz in Iran. It also censored one track before it was released. It features a traditional Persian folk song "Mastom, Mastom" ("Drunk, Drunk") which verse refers to an unrequited or impossible love.

Background
Following the Islamic Revolution of 1979, Yaghmaei spent over a month for recording three Sol-e series albums. Initially this album was recorded as Sol-e 3. Where, Sol-e 1 was reissued in 1979 on CD as Parandeye Mohajer by Los Angeles-based record label Caltex Records, and Sol-e 2 was recorded with Fereydoon Foroughi and released in 1980.

Track listing

Personnel

Musicians
 Kourosh Yaghmaei – lead vocals, guitar, bass guitar, choral, keyboard, orchestra arrangement 
 Kamran Yaghmaei - rhythm guitar, drama, choral
 Kambiz Yaghmaei - keyboard, percussion, crawl
 Kaveh Yaghmaei – keyboard
 Satgin Yaghmaei – crawl
 Helen Musakhani – vocals

References

Cite

External links

2000 albums
Kourosh Yaghmaei albums
Persian-language albums